John D. Lively (born November 30, 1946 in La Grande, Oregon) is an American politician and a Democratic member of the Oregon House of Representatives representing District 12 since January 14, 2013. Lively was the mayor of Springfield, Oregon and a member of its city council from 1977 until 1986.

Education
Lively graduated from Thurston High School, Lane Community College, and the University of Oregon.

Elections
In 2012, When Democratic Representative Terry Beyer retired and left the District 12 seat open, Lively won the May 15, 2012, Democratic primary with 2,688 votes (66.4%), and won the November 6, 2012, general election with 12,213 votes (53.7%) against Republican nominee Joe Pishioneri.

References

External links
Official page at the Oregon Legislative Assembly
Campaign site
 

1946 births
Living people
Mayors of places in Oregon
Democratic Party members of the Oregon House of Representatives
People from La Grande, Oregon
People from Springfield, Oregon
University of Oregon alumni
Lane Community College alumni
21st-century American politicians